Barcarena may refer to: 
 Barcarena (Oeiras), a parish in the municipality of Oeiras, Portugal
 Barcarena, Pará, Brazil